The Crown of Rus, also known as the Crown of Kingdom of Galicia–Volhynia, is the crown with which Daniel of Galicia was crowned in 1253 by a papal archbishop in Drohiczyn. The coronation of Daniel took place around the same time as Mindaugas.

The Crown of Rus is related to territories around the city of Lviv and should not be confused with the modern Russia based in Moscow.

History 
The crowning of Daniel of Galicia is a debated topic, most historians landing around the year 1253, but the specific date is not known. Historian Mykhailo Hrushevsky wrote that the coronation took place in 1252, Vladimir Pashuto considered the date to be around 1254, and Mykola Kotlyar gives the year 1253. Daniel took crown from the hands of Opizzo Fieschi, a papal legate and nephew of Pope Innocent IV.

The crown is believed to have been lost. However, there are many speculations on where it might be located, including Poland, the Vatican, the United States, and Russia. Polish historian  believes that the crown was converted into a miter for Ukrainian Greek Catholic Church bishops in Peremyshl and searches for it in Polish monasteries.

Replica 
After Ukrainian independence in 1991, work began on a replica, based on the drawings and historical data by the jewelers from Kyiv and Western Ukraine. The crown was finished in 2000s and now part of a permanent exhibit of the Zolochiv Castle in Western Ukraine.

Gallery

See also
 Daniel of Galicia
 Mindaugas
 Kingdom of Galicia–Volhynia
 Zolochiv Castle

References 

Kingdom of Galicia–Volhynia
National symbols of Ukraine
Rus